Lađevci is a village situated in Kraljevo municipality in Serbia. According to the 2002 census, the village has a population of 1,258 people.

References

Populated places in Raška District